The Jaragua forest lizard (Guarocuyus jaraguanus) is a species of lizard of the family Diploglossidae. It is the only member of the genus Guarocuyus. It is found in the Dominican Republic, where it is known only from two small, adjacent keys in the Laguna de Oviedo, a lagoon in Jaragua National Park. It was named in honor of the Taíno cacique Enriquillo, whose indigenous name is thought to have been Guarocuya.  

Being both a monotypic genus and species restricted to a single island and described only in 2022, G. jaraguanus is unique among recently-described reptiles. It is the sister group to the clade containing the genera Celestus, Comptus, and Panolopus (the latter two of which were previously considered synonymous with Celestus until 2021). It is unique among celestines due to its nocturnal, arboreal habits with a semi-prehensile tail and webbed toes.

References

Diploglossidae
Reptiles of the Dominican Republic
Endemic fauna of the Dominican Republic
Monotypic lizard genera